Theodore William Greene (January 25, 1932 – April 16, 1982) was an American football linebacker who played three seasons in the American Football League (AFL) with the Dallas Texans. Greene played college football at the University of Tampa. He was a member of the Dallas Texans team that won the 1962 AFL championship.

References

External links
Just Sports Stats

1932 births
1982 deaths
Players of American football from Kentucky
American football linebackers
Tampa Spartans football players
Dallas Texans (AFL) players